Nancy Louise Moritz (born March 3, 1960) is a  United States circuit judge of the United States Court of Appeals for the Tenth Circuit and former Associate Justice on the Kansas Supreme Court.

Biography

Moritz (formerly Caplinger) was born in Beloit, Kansas. She grew up in Tipton, Kansas, before her family moved to Salina, Kansas, when Moritz was 15 years old. She graduated valedictorian of her class from Sacred Heart High School in Salina. She received her Bachelor of Business Administration degree from Washburn University in 1982 and her Juris Doctor from Washburn Law School in 1985. She has two daughters.

Legal career

Moritz began her legal career in 1985 as a research attorney for Justice Harold S. Herd of the Kansas Supreme Court. In 1987, she became a law clerk to Judge Patrick F. Kelly with the United States District Court for the District of Kansas. From 1989 to 1995, she was an associate with the law firm Spencer, Fane, Britt and Browne in Kansas City.  She then became an Assistant United States Attorney in Kansas City until 1999, when she became an Appellate Coordinator for the United States Attorney's office.  She held this position until her appointment to the Kansas Court of Appeals in 2004. Kansas Governor Mark Parkinson appointed her to the Kansas Supreme Court in November 2010, and she was sworn in on January 7, 2011, replacing former Chief Justice Robert E. Davis, serving until July 29, 2014.

Federal judicial service 

In August 2013, President Barack Obama tapped Moritz for a seat on the United States Court of Appeals for the Tenth Circuit. On April 29, 2014, Senate Majority Leader Harry Reid filed for cloture on Moritz's nomination On Thursday May 1, 2014, the Senate invoked cloture on her nomination by a 60–38 vote. On Monday, May 5, 2014, her nomination was confirmed by a 90–3 vote. She received her commission on July 29, 2014.

References

External links

1960 births
Living people
21st-century American judges
21st-century American women judges
Assistant United States Attorneys
Judges of the United States Court of Appeals for the Tenth Circuit
Justices of the Kansas Supreme Court
Kansas Court of Appeals Judges
People from Beloit, Kansas
People from Mitchell County, Kansas
United States court of appeals judges appointed by Barack Obama
Washburn University alumni
Washburn University School of Law alumni